Abu 'Abd Allah Muhammad ibn Muhammad ibn al-Nu'man al-'Ukbari al-Baghdadi, known as al-Shaykh al-Mufid and Ibn al-Mu'allim (c.9481022 CE), was a prominent Twelver Shia theologian. His father was a teacher (mu'allim), hence the name Ibn al-Mu'allim. The title "al-Mufid" was given to him either by Muhammad al-Mahdi, the twelfth Shia Imam, or by al-Rummani, a Sunni scholar, after a conversation with him. The leader of the Shia community, he was a mutakallim, theologian, and Shia jurist.

He was taught by Al-Shaykh al-Saduq, Ibn Qulawayh, Abu Abdallah al-Basri and al-Rummani, and Sharif al-Murtaza and Shaykh Tusi were among his students. Only 10 of his 200 works have survived, among which are Amali, Al-Irshad, Al-Muqni'ah, and Tashih al-Itiqadat.

Early life and education 

Al-Mufid was born in 'Ukbara, a small town to the north of Baghdad, on 11th Dhul Qa'dah in 336 Hijra. According to Shaykh Tusi, however, he was born in 338AH, and later migrated with his father to Baghdad, where the Shia Buwayhids were ruling. He studied with Ibn Babawayh.

Sharif al-Murtaza and Shaykh Tusi were among his students. His career coincided with that of the Mu'tazili theologian and leader of the Bahshamiyya school, 'Abd al-Jabbar. Al-Mufid was often attacked, and his library and school were destroyed.

He was also called Ibn Muallim, meaning "son of the teacher"; Muallim was his father. Among his teachers were the Shia theologian Abu Ali al-Iskafi, Abu Abdallah al-Marzubani, Abu Abdallah al-Basri, Abu al-Hassan, and Ali ibn Isa al-Rummani.

Commonly known as the leader of the Shia, Al-Mufid is regarded as the most famous scholar of the Buyid period and an eminent jurist, mainly due to his contributions in the field of kalam. According to Ibn al-Nadim, who knew al-Mufid personally, he was the head of the Shia Mutekallimun in the field of kalam, and al-Tawhidi, who was also personally familiar with al-Mufid, described him as "eloquent and skillful at dialectic (jadal)". His skill in polemical debate was such that he was said to be capable of convincing his opponents "that a wooden column was actually gold". He was taught the Islamic science of hadith by Al-Shaykh al-Saduq.

His nickname "al-Mufid"

It is said that al-Mufid earned his name "al-Mufid" as a result of a dispute about the relative merits of two events, the Ghadir Khumm and the Cave. Al-Mufid participated in a lecture given by Isa al-Rummani, where in a response to a question al-Rummani claimed that Ghadir Khum was based merely on riwayah (transmitted tradition), while the story of the Cave was based on diraya (knowledge). After the lecture, al-Mufid visited al-Rummani and asked him about Aisha, Talha, and Zubayr, who had rebelled against Ali, "a legitimate Imam". Al-Rummani responded that they had repented, and al-Mufid claimed that their repenting was merely based on riwaya, whereas the war was based in diraya. Al-Rummani then sent al-Mufid to al-Basri, with a note nicknaming the bearer "al-Mufid" ("the Instructor"). However, according to Ibn Shahr Ashub, in his Ma'alimul Ulamaa, the name was given to him by Muhammad al-Mahdi, the twelfth Shia Imam.

As a theologian

Taught by Abdallah al-Basri, the Mutazili theologian and hanafi jurist, al-Mufid adopted many theological opinions. Macdermott believes that al-Mufid's theology is closer to the old Baghdad school of Mutazilism than to Abdul Jabbar's late Basran system. His methodology is closer to that of the Baghdad school, and he seems to have followed the Baghdad school and Mutazilism in his views concerning such questions as God's unity and justice. However, al-Mufid differs from Mutazilism on the problem of Imamate and the position of grave sin in this life. Al-Mufid tried to defend the role of reasonhe described it as Al-Nazarand also disputed for the truth and put away faults with the help of argument and proofs. Also, al-Mufid believed that the task of a theologian was according to reason and argument. His views were adopted by his pupils, 'Abd al-Jabbar and Sharif al-Murtaza.

God's attributes

Al-Mufid defined God's unity in this way: According to al-Mufid, all believers in God's unity, save for "some eccentric anthropomorphists", agree with this. Like Mutazilis, al-Mufid rejected "the simple realism of the Ash'arite theory of attribution". However, al-Mufid and 'Abd al-Jabbar give different explanations of what an attribute is, and whether it is in an object or in the mind.

Prophecy
According to al-Mufid, there is an absolute necessity for prophets, since in order to know God and moral principles man needs revelation, and he noted that "every apostle (rasul) is a prophet but every prophet (nabi) is not an apostle". Although he took care to make a distinction between an apostle and a prophet as the Quran does, he did not believe that there was a difference in their functions, which enabled him to put the Imams on the level of the prophets and the apostles except in terms of their names.

Imamah
Al-Mufid defined the Imamiya as those who believe in the necessity of Imamah, Ismah and personal nass, i.e., personal designation. He tended to the belief that the Imams are superior to all the prophets and apostles, with the exception of Muhammad. According to al-Mufid, Imams can "take the place of the prophets in enforcing judgments, seeing to the execution of the legal penalties, safeguarding the Law, and educating mankind", a definition which makes an Imam not only "the head of the community in administrative, judicial, and military matters", but an "authoritative teacher of mankind". This attitude regarding Shia Imam is the basis of other teaching in Mufid theology such as Imam's immunity from sin and error, the necessity of having an imam in all the times and the way the Imam should be designated.

His criticisms of Al-Shaykh al-Saduq

On a number of occasions al-Mufid was critical of his teacher, Al-Shaykh al-Saduq, and his Tashih al-Itiqadat was a correction of al-Saduq's Risalat al-Itaqadat. Not limiting himself to theological matters, al-Mufid rejected al-Saduq's resort to akhbar al-ahad (single tradition), particularly when a legal statement is to be issued. However, he did not object to al-Saduq's views concerning the extent of the Quran; he only criticized his views on the nature of the Quran. Unlike al-Saduq, al-Mufid accepted "religious and speculative theology". While al-Saduq allowed controversy "only in the form of quoting and explaining the words of God, the Prophet, and the Imams", reporting a tradition from Ja'far al-Sadiq, the sixth Imam of Shia, al-Mufid believed that there were two kinds of disputationnamely, "true" and "vain".

Works

Shaykh al-Mufid is said to have written 200 works, of which only a few more than ten have survived. Some of his works are as follows:

  Al-Amali (of Shaykh Mufid), also known as "Al-Majaalis", traditions recorded by al-Mufid's pupils during the sessions where al-Mufid gave the chain of narration ending up with himself
 Tashih al-Itiqadat, a correction of al-Saduq's Risalat al-Itiqadat
 َAwail Al Maqalat, an elaboration of al-Mufid's theology and "a practical catalogue of Imamite positions on disputed questions"
 Kitab al-Irshad or Al-Irshad fi ma'rifat hujaj Allah 'ala al-'ibad, on the lives of the Shia Imams
 Al-Fusul al-`Ashara fi al-Ghaybah
 Ahkam al-Nisa, on legal obligations regarding women
 Fifth Risalah on Ghaybah
 Al-Muqni'ah (The Legally Sufficient)  The commentary on this book by Shaykh Tusi, Tadhhib al-Ahkam fi Sharh al-Muqni'ah, is among the Shia four books.

Tawqees

Al-Mufid received two Tawqees by Muhammad al-Mahdi during major occultation.

Death 

Al-Mufid died on the third day of Ramadan in 413AH. According to the Shia writer Shaykh Tusi, "The day of his death drew the largest crowd ever seen in any funeral, and both friends and foes wept uncontrollably". He remained buried in his own house for two years, after which his body was moved to Al Kadhimiya Mosque and buried next to his teacher, Ibn Qulawayh al-Qummi. His grave is near the feet of two of the Shia Imams, Musa al-Kadhim and his grandson Muhammad al-Jawad.

In popular culture

The ninth day of Azar in Iran's official calendar is the commemoration day of Shaykh al-Mufid.
An image of Mofid has been shown as imaginary in a paint.

See also

 Muhammad al-Kulaynī
 Allāmah Majlisī
 Shaykh al-Hur al-Āmilī
 Ja'fari jurisprudence
 Holiest sites in Islam

Secondary studies

 Paul Sander, Zwischen Charisma und Ratio, Berlin, 1994
 Tamima Bayhom-Daou, Shaykh Mufid, Makers of the Muslim World, Oxford, 2005

References

External links 

 Al-Amali
 Kitab al-Irshad
 Karbala Historical Resources
 The Emendation of a Shi‘ite Creed
 Kitab Al-Irshad

948 births
1022 deaths
10th-century Arabs
11th-century Arabs
Iraqi Shia Muslims
Shia scholars of Islam
People from Baghdad